Vietacheta is a genus of crickets in the family Gryllidae and tribe Gryllini.  Species can be found in southern China and Vietnam.  A key to the species is given by Ma et al.

Species 
Vietacheta includes the following species:
 Vietacheta aquila Gorochov, 1992
 Vietacheta fumea Gorochov, 1992
 Vietacheta harpophylla Ma, Liu & Xu, 2015
 Vietacheta picea Gorochov, 1992 - type species - locality: near Tam Dao village, Vinh Phu Province.

References

External links
 

Ensifera genera
Gryllinae
Orthoptera of Indo-China